Where The Long Shadows Fall (Beforetheinmostlight) is an EP by English band Current 93. It forms the first part of the Inmost Light trilogy; the second being 1996's All The Pretty Little Horses: The Inmost Light and the last being 1996's The Starres Are Marching Sadly Home (Theinmostlightthirdandfinal). The piece consists of David Tibet's spoken and whispered vocals over eerie noises and the "long shadows" loop, which is a sample of Alessandro Moreschi, the only castrato who made recordings, singing "Domine, Domine". Barely audible at the end of the piece is John Balance speaking the improvised phrase, "Why can't we all just walk away?" A 17-second excerpt of "The Frolic", from All the Pretty Little Horses, appears as a hidden track.

Originally available on compact disc and vinyl, the EP was reissued as part of the boxed set The Inmost Light in 2007.

Track listing
"Where the Long Shadows Fall (Beforetheinmostlight)"  – 19:10

Personnel
 David Michael Tibet – vocals
 Michael Cashmore – guitar, bass
 David Kenny – guitar, engineering
 Steven Stapleton – bells, mixing
 John Balance – vocals

1995 EPs
Current 93 albums